The Quebec Open is a golf tournament that is held in Quebec, Canada. It was first held in 1909.

The tournament was a regular event on the Canadian Tour and its predecessors until 1992 when loss of sponsorship led to it failing to meet tour minimum prize money requirements. It continued for several years, appearing on the tour again in 1996, before enduring an extended hiatus until it was revived in 2014. It then became a stop on the Circuit Canada Pro Tour until the circuit ceased operating at the start of 2019.

Originally a 36-hole stroke play event, the tournament was extended to 54 holes in 1966, only reverting to 36 holes in 1978 and 1979 following the demise of the Peter Jackson Tour. It became a 72-hole tournament in 1988, adopting shorter formats between 1992 and 1995 after dropping from the tour.

Winners

References

PGA Tour Canada events
Golf tournaments in Quebec
Recurring sporting events established in 1909
1909 establishments in Quebec